The Association for Computing Machinery Special Interest Group on University and College Computing Services Hall of Fame Award  was established by the Association for Computing Machinery to recognize individuals whose specific contributions have had a positive impact on the organization and therefore on the professional careers of the members and their institutions.

Recipients

 2000   Alicia Ewing Towster
 2000   Frank A Thomas
 2000   John E Skelton
 2000   Gordon R Sherman
 2000   Rita Seplowitz Saltz
 2000   Robert W Lutz
 2000   Ralph E Lee
 2000   William Heinbecker
 2000   Jane Shearin Caviness
 2000   Jean Bonney
 2001   James R Wruck
 2001   Barbara Wolfe
 2001   Lawrence W Westermeyer
 2001   Russel S Vaught
 2001   Jerry Niebaum
 2001   James L Moss
 2001   Polley Ann McClure
 2001   Elizabeth R Little
 2001   Priscilla Jane Huston
 2001   John H "Jack" Esbin
 2002   Terris Wolff
 2002   Lois Secrist
 2002   Jerry Martin
 2002   Carl Malstrom
 2002   Geraldine MacDonald
 2002   Sheri Prupis
 2002   Larry Pickett
 2002   Diane Jung
 2002   Fred Harris
 2002   John Bucher
 2003   Michael Yohe
 2003   Vincent H Swoyer
 2003   Beth Ruffo
 2003   Dennis Mar
 2003   Leila C Lyons
 2003   Linda Hutchison
 2003   Tex Hull
 2003   Patrick J Gossman
 2004   Stan Yagi
 2004   Alan Herbert
 2004   Susan Nycum
 2004   Greydon D Freeman
 2004   Lida Larsen
 2004   M Lloyd Edwards
 2004   Thea Drell Hodge
 2004   Linda Downing
 2005   Mervin E Muller
 2005   Glen R Ingram
 2005   Jennifer Fajman
 2005   Jim Bostick
 2005   Kay K Beach
 2006   Leland H Williams
 2006   Chris Jones
 2006   Marion F Taylor
 2006   John W Hamblen
 2006   Glenda E Moum
 2006   Jayne Ashworth
 2007   Shiree Moreland
 2007   Phil Isensee
 2007   Kathy Mayberry
 2007   Bonnie Hites
 2007   Jeanne Kellogg
 2007   Susan Hales
 2008   Jerry Smith
 2008   Robert Paterson
 2008   John Lateulere
 2008   Jack McCredie
 2009   Glenn Ricart
 2009   Lynnell Lacy
 2009   Teresa Lockard
 2009   Jim Kerlin
 2009   Nancy Bauer
 2010   Jennifer "Jen" Whiting
 2010   Ann Amsler
 2011   Richard Nelson
 2011   Alex Nagorski
 2011   Timothy Foley
 2012 No recipients
 2013   Jim Yucha
 2013   Christine Vucinich
 2013   Leila Shahbender
 2013   Cindy Sanders
 2013   Carol Rhodes
 2013   Patti Mitch
 2013   Greg Hanek
 2013   Gale Fritsche
 2014   Elizabeth Wagnon
 2014   Robert Haring-Smith
 2014   Parrish Nnambi
 2014   Karen McRitchie
 2015   Jacquelynn Hongosh
 2016   Debbie Fisher
 2016   Naomi Fujimura
 2016   Takashi Yamanoue
 2017   Melissa Bauer
 2017   Allan Chen
 2017   Beth Rugg
 2017   Kelly Wainwright
 2018   Miranda Carney-Morris
 2018   Trevor Murphy
 2018   Mo Nishiyama
 2018   Gail Rankin
 2019   No recipients
 2020   Chester Andrews
 2020   Mat Felthousen
 2020   Dan Herrick
 2020   Chris King
 2020   Becky Lineberry

See also

 List of computer science awards
 See Qualifications and Nominations page, at the ACM SIGUCCS Web Page.
 Hall of Fame Web Page at ACM/SIGUCCS

References

Association for Computing Machinery
Awards established in 2000
Halls of fame in New York (state)
Computer science awards